Edwin Leard Mechem (July 2, 1912 – November 27, 2002) was an American attorney, politician, and jurist from New Mexico. He served as the 15th, 17th, and 19th governor of New Mexico, the first person born in the 20th century to become the state's governor, as well as the first person born in New Mexico after statehood to ascend to the office. During his final term as governor, Mechem appointed himself as a United States Senator, pursuant to the Seventeenth Amendment to the United States Constitution. During his tenure, he was one of five non-Southern Republicans in the Senate to vote against the Civil Rights Act 1964. He was defeated in his bid to keep his senate seat in the 1964 United States Senate election in New Mexico. He later served as a United States district judge of the United States District Court for the District of New Mexico.

Early life and education

Born in Alamogordo, New Mexico, he attended schools in Alamogordo and Las Cruces. He attended New Mexico A&M University (now New Mexico State University) from 1930 to 1931 and 1935, where he was a member of Alpha Delta Theta fraternity. When it became a chapter of Sigma Pi fraternity Mechem was one of the first alumni to be initiated into the national organization. He worked as a land surveyor for the United States Bureau of Reclamation in Las Cruces from 1932 to 1935. He transferred his college credits to the University of Arkansas School of Law and graduated in 1939 with a Bachelor of Laws.

Career

New Mexico politics 

He was admitted to the New Mexico Bar in 1939 and practiced law in Las Cruces and later Albuquerque, New Mexico. He was an FBI agent from 1942 to 1945 and a member of the New Mexico House of Representatives from 1947 to 1948.

He was elected Governor in 1950 and 1952, did not run in 1954, and was elected again in 1956. In 1954 he ran for the United States Senate but was defeated by sitting Senator Clinton Presba Anderson. After winning another term as governor in 1956, he was defeated for reelection again in 1958, then elected to a fourth term in 1960. A member of the Committee on Government Security from 1956 to 1957, and a member of the American Law Institute, he was again elected Governor in 1960. Mechem lost his bid for reelection on November 6, 1962. He arranged his own appointment (as was his prerogative under the Seventeenth Amendment) to the United States Senate when long-time senator Dionisio "Dennis" Chavez died later that month. In the Senate he voted against the Civil Rights Act of 1964. He served until November 1964 and resumed his law practice after an unsuccessful run for reelection. He was a member of the New Mexico Commission on Reorganization of the Executive Branch and a member of the New Mexico State Police Commission.

Federal judicial service

Mechem was nominated by President Richard Nixon on September 3, 1970, to the United States District Court for the District of New Mexico, to a new seat authorized by 84 Stat. 294. He was confirmed by the United States Senate on October 8, 1970, and received his commission on October 14, 1970. He assumed senior status on July 3, 1982. His service terminated on November 27, 2002, due to his death.

Notable ruling

As a judge, Mechem's made a ruling protecting the rights of American Indians on Indian lands from government interference.

Personal

Mechem's father, Edwin Mechem Sr., had been a respected state district judge in Las Cruces. He was the nephew of another New Mexican governor, Merritt C. Mechem.

Death

Mechem died in November 27, 2002, in Albuquerque.

References

Sources
 
 
 Obituary via ''The Associated Press

1912 births
2002 deaths
People from Alamogordo, New Mexico
American people of English descent
Methodists from New Mexico
Republican Party United States senators from New Mexico
Republican Party governors of New Mexico
Republican Party members of the New Mexico House of Representatives
Judges of the United States District Court for the District of New Mexico
United States district court judges appointed by Richard Nixon
20th-century American judges
Federal Bureau of Investigation agents